Haitangxi station is a metro station on the Loop Line of Chongqing Rail Transit in Nan'an District of Chongqing Municipality, China.

It serves the area surrounding Yutai Road, including nearby office buildings, residential blocks and a Marriott hotel.

The station opened on 28 December 2018.

Station Structure

Floors

Loop Line Platform
Platform Layout
An island platform is used for Loop Line trains travelling in both directions.

Exits
There are a total of 3 entrances/exits for the station.

Surroundings

Nearby Places
Yanyu Road
Nan'an Youngsters Activity Center
Jiangnan Sports Center

Nearby Stations
Luojiaba station (a Loop Line station)
Shangxinjie station (a Loop Line & Line 6 station)

See also
Chongqing Rail Transit (CRT)
Loop Line (CRT)

References

Railway stations in Chongqing
Railway stations in China opened in 2018
Chongqing Rail Transit stations